John Albert "Burt" Aull (January 29, 1871 - February 1, 1947) was an early football player with the Pittsburgh Athletic Club, prior to the club's hiring of professional football players.

Aull was born to William Ferris and Anna (Martin) Aull in 1871 in Pittsburgh. He was the brother of the team's captain and quarterback, Charley Aull. During a game held on November 21, 1892, against Pittsburgh's rival, the Allegheny Athletic Association, Burt was knocked out of the game in the first half with a severely bruised head. Burt's brother, Charley, was also reportedly injured when he was crushed beneath a pile of several Allegheny players. As a result Charley's back was so wrenched, he had to be taken off the field on a stretcher. The game was of historical significance since it was the first known game to feature a professional player, Pudge Heffelfinger, who was paid $500 by Allegheny to play in the game.

Aull died of a cerebral hemorrhage at Middleton, Ohio in 1947, aged 76.

References

Players of American football from Pennsylvania
Pittsburgh Athletic Club (football) players
19th-century players of American football
1871 births
1947 deaths